is a public university in Nayoro, Hokkaido, Japan. The school was established as a junior women's college in 1960, and it became a four-year college in 2006.

External links
 

Educational institutions established in 1960
Public universities in Japan
Universities and colleges in Hokkaido
1960 establishments in Japan
Japanese junior colleges